This is a list of the heritage sites in Paarl as recognized by the South African Heritage Resource Agency.

|}

References 

Paarl
Tourist attractions in the Western Cape
Heritage sites